Enoki Irqittuq is a former territorial level politician from Hall Beach, Nunavut, Canada. He served as a member of the Legislative Assembly of Nunavut from 1999 until 2004.

Irqittuq was elected in the 1999 Nunavut general election. He won the electoral district of Amittuq in a close race defeating former Northwest Territories MLA Mark Evaloarjuk and three other candidates winning 33% of the popular vote. He ran for a second term in office in the 2004 Nunavut general election but was badly defeated by candidate Louis Tapardjuk finishing second last in a field of five candidates.

References

Members of the Legislative Assembly of Nunavut
21st-century Canadian politicians
Living people
Inuit politicians
People from Hall Beach
Mayors of places in Nunavut
Inuit from the Northwest Territories
1955 births
Inuit from Nunavut